William Fritz Afflis (June 27, 1929 – November 10, 1991) was an American professional wrestler, promoter, and NFL player, better known by his ring name, Dick the Bruiser. During his NFL days he played four seasons with the Green Bay Packers. In addition to that he was also hugely successful in professional Wrestling being a  fifteen-time world champion, having held the AWA World Heavyweight Championship once, the WWA World Heavyweight Championship (Indianapolis version) thirteen times and the WWA World Heavyweight Championship (Los Angeles version) once. He also excelled at Tag-Team wrestling having won 20 Tag Team championships, having held the AWA tag team championship five times and the WWA tag team championship a record 15 times in his career. 11 of these championships were won alongside his long-time Tag-Team partner Crusher Lisowski.  

He was one of the most hated as well as well known heels from the mid 50s till the early 80s. He was famous for his feuds with the likes of such stalwarts such as Lou Thesz, Bobo Brazil, Angelo Poffo and "Classie" Freddie Blassie. For his achievements he would be inducted into the WWE hall of fame class of 2021. He was also inducted into the 2005 International Wrestling Hall of Fame.

Early life
Born in Delphi, Indiana, he moved to Indianapolis when his mother got a job there during World War II. Afflis played football during his freshman and sophomore years for Shortridge High School in Indianapolis. After his mother lost her job, the family moved back to Delphi, and the high school there did not have a football team. Afflis took up residence at the YMCA in nearby Lafayette, Indiana, so that he was eligible to attend  Lafayette Jefferson High School where he played football and wrestled. Afflis went on to attend Purdue University and the University of Nevada, Reno, playing varsity football at both schools. He also worked as a bouncer at a Reno nightclub.

American football career
Selected 186th overall in the 16th round of the 1951 professional football draft, Afflis played football for the Green Bay Packers from 1951 to 1954. as a lineman. He appeared in all 48 regular season games the Packers played in those years, although the team never finished better than fourth place. Afflis suffered an injury to his larynx while playing for the Packers. This resulted in his trademark gravelly voice that he would keep for the rest of his life.

Professional wrestling career
Bruiser made his professional Wrestling debut in 1954. He was trained by Verne Gagne. Afflis started wrestling in Chicago in 1955 under the Bruiser moniker where he faced Verne Gagne and Lou Thesz. Gagne guided him in his initial days of becoming a  professional wrestler. From then into the late 1950s, Dick the Bruiser wrestled live every Thursday on TV in the Detroit area. His typical opponent was "an up and coming young (unknown) wrestler" who would be pulverized by the Bruiser. His matches and interviews were so effective he became a household name in the Detroit area. His only defeat on live TV was at the hands of "Cowboy" Bob Ellis. However, in two rematches with Ellis at the Olympia in Detroit, the Bruiser was victorious. In 1963, Dick the Bruiser was involved in an angle with NFL star Alex Karras to set up a match between the two. Bruiser was supposed to brawl with Karras at Lindell’s Bar, a drinking establishment co-owned by Karras and the Butsicaris brothers. What was supposed to be a worked shoot turned into a real brawl when one of the Butsicaris boys’ uncles attacked Dick the Bruiser, unaware the event was staged. Bruiser proceeded to destroy the bar as well a number of police officers who showed up to the melee; there were reportedly over 300 people hurt. In the end, eight officers subdued him, and the Bruiser ultimately won the match. At the end, he was charged with aggravated assault and had to cover $50,000 in damages for two policemen that he injured during the brawl.

On November 19, 1957, Dick the Bruiser and Dr. Jerry Graham engaged in a tag team match at Madison Square Garden in New York City before a crowd reported as 12,987 fans. Their opponents were Antonino Rocca and Édouard Carpentier. After the match ended, fighting among the wrestlers continued, and a large number of fans joined in, leading to a riot. Two policemen were injured, two fans were arrested and over 60 policemen had difficulty dispersing the angry crowd. The floor of the arena was littered with hundreds of broken chairs. As a result, Dick the Bruiser was banned for life by the New York State Athletic Commission.

Afflis, along with fellow wrestler and business partner Wilbur Snyder, purchased the Indianapolis NWA promotion in 1964 from its longtime owner Jim Barnett. Afflis renamed the territory the World Wrestling Association (WWA) and promoted himself as its champion. While he ran it as an independent promotion with its own titles and champion, the WWA had a working agreement with the larger AWA (owned by wrestler Verne Gagne), sharing talent and recognizing their championships. This agreement benefited both promotions and led to the Bruiser having five AWA World Tag Team Championship reigns, with tag team partner, The Crusher, who was billed as his "cousin". The Bruiser was the first to christen Manager Bobby Heenan with  the nickname of "The Weasel" during his run in the territory. Afflis' WWA ran from 1964 until 1989, when he finally tired of losing talent, TV, and fan attendance to the World Wrestling Federation (WWF). In 1971 he teamed with The Shiek and faced Crazy Luke Graham and Tarzan Tyler for the newly created WWWF Tagteam Championship which graham and Tyler won.

Afflis, with his charisma, NFL notoriety, and gravelly-voiced, tough-guy persona was a legitimate cross-media star, becoming something of a hero in the Indianapolis area. He made his home on the northwest side of the city. Indianapolis native David Letterman (whose career would be launched by the Bruiser) would later name his television show's band The World's Most Dangerous Band as a derivation of Dick the Bruiser's nickname, "The World's Most Dangerous Wrestler." The moniker "Dick the Bruiser" was even used in the 1980s by George Baier, a co-host of the morning drive show on Detroit rock radio station WRIF. Baier's "Richard T. Bruiser" was an effective, entertaining impersonation of Afflis, who actually played himself in a number of popular TV ads for WRIF. After retiring, Afflis was a color commentator for the Gorgeous Ladies of Wrestling (GLOW), founded by David McLane, who had previously risen through the ranks as a teenager to manage the WWA for The Bruiser.  He also worked as a talent agent for World Championship Wrestling (WCW), and was the special guest referee at the Starrcade 1990 main event between Sting and the Black Scorpion.

Personal life and death
His son in law wrestles as Dick the Bruiser Jr. in the independent circuit.

Afflis died of internal bleeding on November 10, 1991, according to a spokesman for Suncoast Hospital in Largo, Florida, near his winter home. His widow, Louise, said her husband had been weightlifting at home with his adopted son, Jon Carney, and ruptured a blood vessel in his esophagus.

Championships and accomplishments
50th State Big Time Wrestling
NWA United States Heavyweight Championship (Hawaii version) (1 time)
American Wrestling Alliance
AWA World Tag Team Championship (2 times) – with Wilbur Snyder
American Wrestling Association
AWA World Heavyweight Championship (1 time)
AWA World Tag Team Championship (5 times) – with The Crusher
World Heavyweight Championship (Omaha version) (1 time)
AWA United States Heavyweight Championship (1 time)
Big Time Wrestling
NWA United States Heavyweight Championship (Detroit version) (4 times)
Fred Kohler Enterprises
NWA United States Heavyweight Championship (Chicago version) (1 time)
NWA World Tag Team Championship (Chicago version) (1 time) – with Gene Kiniski
Japan Wrestling Association
NWA International Tag Team Championship (1 time) – with The Crusher
Pro Wrestling Illustrated
PWI Tag Team of the Year (1972) with The Crusher
Ranked #300 of the top 500 singles wrestlers of the "PWI Years" in 2003
Professional Wrestling Hall of Fame
(Class of 2005) – Tag Team with Crusher
(Class of 2011) – Television Era
St. Louis Wrestling Club
NWA Missouri Heavyweight Championship (3 times)
St. Louis Wrestling Hall of Fame
(Class of 2007)
World Championship Wrestling
WCW Hall of Fame (Class of 1994)
World Wrestling Association
WWA World Heavyweight Championship (13 times)
WWA World Tag Team Championship (15 times) – with The Crusher (6), Wilbur Snyder (3), Bruno Sammartino (1), Bill Miller (1), Spike Huber (1), Jeff Van Kamp (1), Bobby Colt (1) and Calypso Jim (1)
Worldwide Wrestling Associates
WWA World Heavyweight Championship (1 time)
Wrestling Observer Newsletter
Wrestling Observer Newsletter Hall of Fame (Class of 1996)
WWE
WWE Hall of Fame (Class of 2021)
Other titles
World Heavyweight Championship (Georgia version) (1 time)

References

External links

1929 births
1991 deaths
American football offensive linemen
American male professional wrestlers
AWA World Heavyweight Champions
Deaths from bleeding
Green Bay Packers players
Nevada Wolf Pack football players
Purdue Boilermakers football players
Professional wrestlers from Indiana
Professional Wrestling Hall of Fame and Museum
20th-century American male actors
People from Delphi, Indiana
Players of American football from Indiana
Professional wrestling promoters
Shortridge High School alumni
Burials in Indiana
WWE Hall of Fame Legacy inductees
20th-century professional wrestlers
AWA World Tag Team Champions
AWA United States Heavyweight Champions
NWA International Tag Team Champions
NWA Georgia Heavyweight Champions